Sar Band-e Kasur (also Romanized as Sar Band-e Kasūr) is a village in Maskun Rural District, Jebalbarez District, Jiroft County, Kerman Province, Iran. At the 2006 census, its population was 107, in 25 families.

References 

Populated places in Jiroft County